Didier Morville, better known by his stage name JoeyStarr, is a French rapper, record producer and actor, from Saint-Denis, Île-de-France. He co-founded the famous French rap band Suprême NTM in 1989 along with Kool Shen. He was born on 27 October 1967.

Life and career

Childhood and upbringing 
JoeyStarr is from a family originating from the French overseas department of Martinique. He had a difficult childhood, having been raised by his violent father until he turned 18. He was taken from his mother when he was five years old, and only saw her again 18 years later. He tells of a time when his father killed his pet rabbit and made him eat it.

In 1985, he joined the military at Baden-Baden, "19 months of hell", an experience which he raps about in his album Authentik.

After the army, he wandered the streets, sleeping in subways and alleys. He discovered drugs and hip-hop, and the latter changed his life.

Suprême NTM 

During his time on the streets, he met another aspiring rapper, Kool Shen, who was also born in Saint-Denis. In 1988 they formed the group Suprême NTM alias NTM.  When the first single came out in 1989, he could not cash the check, since he could not provide an address or a bank account.

The group achieved record sales with their four albums, but split in 1998.

It had a comeback as announced on 13 March 2008.

Personal life 
JoeyStarr had an infamous romantic liaison with French actress Béatrice Dalle, and the couple appeared on TV shows and promotional events. JoeyStarr has two sons, Mathis and Kalil, with his current girlfriend, hip-hop journalist Leïla Dixmier.

In 1999, he was sentenced to two months in prison for physically harassing a stewardess. He was also sentenced to three months in prison and fined 2,000 euros for physically abusing a former partner. His criminal record includes 13 infractions. In 2003, he was condemned for animal brutality for hitting a monkey on national television, and was heavily criticized in the press and by his fans.

Awards and nominations
Music 
2007: "Best rap artist" during L'Année du hip-hop Les trophées
2008: "Best concert" during L'Année du hip-hop Les trophées
Acting
2010: Nomination for "Best actor in a secondary role" during César Award for his role in Le Bal des actrices
2012: Nomination for "Best actor in a secondary role" during César Award for his role in Polisse
2012: Laureate for Patrick Dewaere Award

Discography

Albums

Mixtapes
2006: My Playlist
2007: L'Anthology Mixtape

Singles

Filmography

Film

Television

1990 : Le Lyonnais (1 episode "Taggers)
2001 : Toc toc toc (TV mini series) as himself
2002 : H - (1 episode, "Lucifer")
2003 : 60 jours 60 nuits de Juliette Baudouin as himself
2008-2010 : Mafiosa, le clan as Moktar
2015 : Call My Agent ! as himself

References

External links

Official website
 

1967 births
Living people
People from Saint-Denis, Seine-Saint-Denis
Rappers from Seine-Saint-Denis
French rappers
Martiniquais musicians
French people of Martiniquais descent
French male film actors
French male television actors
21st-century French male actors